Marshal Scotty's Playland Park is an abandoned theme park in El Cajon, California. The park contained multiple attractions, such as a railroad, a  Ferris wheel, a water slide, a small roller coaster, and a tilt-a-whirl ride.

The park is privately owned and is now mostly abandoned and fenced off. In 2017, numerous relics were still visible from the road, through overgrown vegetation. Starting in 2015, the park now opens every Friday and Saturday in October as a "Haunted Amusement Park" and scare trail.

References 

Defunct amusement parks in California
History of San Diego County, California
Amusement parks in California
1967 establishments in California
1998 disestablishments in California
Western (genre) theme parks
Amusement parks opened in 1967
Amusement parks closed in 1998
Modern ruins